Adolfo Baloncieri (27 July 1897 – 23 July 1986) was an Italian football manager and former player who played as a midfielder.

Critically regarded as one of the greatest footballers of all time, Gianni Brera considered him one of the greatest Italian playmakers ever, alongside the likes of Giuseppe Meazza and Valentino Mazzola. In 2010, Carlo Felice Chiesa wrote: "If it were possible to rank all-time great "registas" of world football, Adolfo Baloncieri, an athlete from a period so remote from our own, would end up among the first, if not first." Baloncieri began his club career with Alessandria, but most notably played for Torino, where they won league titles in 1927 and 1928 (the 1927 title was later revoked). Following his retirement, he also coached several clubs in Italy.

At international level, he took part at three editions of the Summer Olympic games with Italy, captaining the Italy national team to a bronze medal at the 1928 Summer Olympics, and also won the 1927-30 Central European International Cup with Italy. With 25 goals, he is the sixth highest all-time scorer of the Italy national team, alongside Filippo Inzaghi and Alessandro Altobelli, and he is also the highest scoring midfielder in the history of the Italy national side.

Early life
Baloncieri was born in Castelceriolo in the province of Alessandria, to a family originally from Caselle Torinese. During childhood he lived with his family in Rosario, Argentina for 12 years where he entered the world of football at age nine. Eager to play sport, he did not complete his studies in accountancy.

His older brother Mario was an amateur footballer in Alessandria and then a reporter, while his cousin William Brezzi, who died at a young age, was his teammate at Alessandria and the national team. His brother Carlo drowned in Finale Ligure in August 1933, while his son also died at a young age. With his other daughter, Flora, a teacher, and a sister, he lived in Genoa in later years. He died in 1986, days before he turned 89, from pneumonia.

Club career
After spending much of his childhood in Argentina, Baloncieri returned to Italy in 1913 and joined Alessandria; for which he debuted in 1914 at the age of 17 before World War I suspended league fixtures. During the conflict he was at the front as a gunner. After football resumed he distinguished himself among the most famous footballers of the 1920s with Torino, when they won two national titles (one was revoked for the "Allemandi Case"). In 1930 he was knighted by the Crown of Italy on the recommendation of the Italian Football Federation's Leandro Arpinati. Baloncieri retired in 1931; interested in the development of young athletes, he was responsible for the development of the Torino youth system. He later became a manager.

International career
At International level, Baloncieri was the captain of the Italy national team that won the bronze medal at the 1928 Olympic Games, and the winner of the 1930 Coppa Internazionale, alongside Giuseppe Meazza. He earned 47 caps for Italy between 1920 and 1930, and with 25 goals, he is Italy's sixth all-time highest goalscorer and the highest scoring midfielder in the history of the Italy national team. He also played in two other editions of the Olympics, in 1920 and 1924, making him the player with the most all-time appearances and goals, eleven and eight respectively, at Olympic football tournaments for the Italy national side.

Style of play
Usually deployed as an offensive playmaker, Baloncieri was a quick, talented, elegant, and creative midfielder, who had excellent technical skills, vision, passing ability, and a notable eye for goal from midfield.

Honours
Torino
Divisione Nazionale/Serie A: 1927–28

Italy
 Central European International Cup: 1927-30
 Summer Olympics: Bronze 1928

Individual
Torino F.C. Hall of Fame

Bibliography

References

External links
 
 
 
 
 Azzurri Stars

1897 births
1986 deaths
People from Alessandria
Italian footballers
Italy international footballers
Torino F.C. players
Olympic footballers of Italy
Footballers at the 1920 Summer Olympics
Footballers at the 1924 Summer Olympics
Footballers at the 1928 Summer Olympics
Olympic bronze medalists for Italy
Serie A players
Serie B players
U.S. Alessandria Calcio 1912 players
Italian football managers
A.S. Roma managers
U.C. Sampdoria managers
S.S.C. Napoli managers
Palermo F.C. managers
FC Chiasso managers
Olympic medalists in football
Medalists at the 1928 Summer Olympics
Association football midfielders
Italian military personnel of World War I
Deaths from pneumonia in Liguria
Sportspeople from the Province of Alessandria